Basiphyllaea corallicola is a species of orchid native to Florida, Bahamas, Cuba, Hispaniola, and Puerto Rico.

Basiphyllaea corallicola is a terrestrial herb up to 40 cm tall, with underground tubers. Leaves are narrowly linear to elliptic, up to 25 cm long. Flowers are borne in a scape of up to 10 nodding flowers, each yellow-green with a white lip.

References

External links
Biota of North America Program, county distribution map, Basiphyllaea corallicola
USDA plants profile, Basiphyllaea corallicola (Small) Ames,  Carter's orchid 
Florida Natural Areas Inventory, Carter's Orchid, Basiphyllaea corallicola
Institute for Regional Conservation, Floristic Inventory of South Florida Online, Basiphyllaea corallicola (Small) Ames,  Carter's orchid 

Bletiinae
Orchids of Florida
Orchids of Haiti
Orchids of Puerto Rico
Flora of the Bahamas
Flora of Cuba
Flora of the Dominican Republic
Plants described in 1910
Flora without expected TNC conservation status